HaEmek Medical Center (Hebrew:  מרכז רפואי העמק, Merkaz refu'i ha-Emek, lit. "The Valley Medical Center") is a regional hospital in the northern Israeli city of Afula.

Located in the central part of the Jezreel Valley (Emek Yizrael), the hospital is one in a network of hospitals owned and operated by Clalit Health Services, and is affiliated with the Technion's Rappaport Faculty of Medicine.

History 

The origins of this medical institution date back to a design by Alexander Baerwald in 1924. The hospital was opened on April 29, 1930. In 1932 it was temporarily closed due to lack of funds. Through the years the hospital gradually grew into one of the biggest medical facilities in Israel. Nowadays the hospital serves about 700,000 residents of the adjacent region. The hospital has about 1,900 employees.

The hospital is located at an altitude of about 500 meters northeast of Afula, off of Highway 65.

The hospital is said to be a place of Arab-Israeli co-existence, and the two peoples work closely together.

See also
Health care in Israel

References

External links
HaEmek Medical Center (official site)

Hospital buildings completed in 1930
Hospitals in Israel
Hospitals established in 1930
Buildings and structures in Northern District (Israel)
1930 establishments in Mandatory Palestine